National Student Federation may refer to:

 National Student Federation, a front organization created by the Apartheid government in South Africa
 National Students Federation, leftist student organization in Pakistan
 National Student Federation of America, a federation of college student governments in the US from the 1920s to the 1940s